The Penthouse Live! is a Philippine television variety show broadcast by GMA Network. It premiered on August 29, 1982 replacing Penthouse Seven. The show concluded on February 15, 1987. It was replaced by Shades in its timeslot.

Overview
The show initially was deemed by critics as too upper-class for its target audience but later on it was embraced by the masses who followed the on-camera, off-camera love affair of its main hosts Martin Nievera and Pops Fernandez. When the show included the comic skit segment Donya Buding, a social commentator portrayed by Nanette Inventor, the show became a phenomenon in itself.

Hosts

 Martin Nievera
 Pops Fernandez

Co-host
 Nanette Inventor

Dancers
 Erich Edralin
 Paolo Basa
 Manolet Santos
 Reynald Santos
 Sonny Reyes
 Eddie Imperial
 Celine Ocampo
 Annamarie Aragon
 Eleanore Torres
 Ailleen Azarraga
 Tetch Julian
 Therese Nuyda
 Peachie Mercado 
 The Tigers (Jojo Alejar & Co.)
 TFU, The Funk Unlimited (Mon Bagis, Apollo Reyes, Benedict Salgado, & Raymond Palisoc)

References

External links
 

1982 Philippine television series debuts
1987 Philippine television series endings
English-language television shows
GMA Network original programming
Philippine variety television shows